Trio (London) 1993 is a live album featuring performances by saxophonists Anthony Braxton and Evan Parker and trombonist Paul Rutherford which was recorded at the Bloomsbury Theatre as part of the 1993 London Jazz Festival and released on the Leo label.

Reception

The Allmusic review by Scott Yanow stated "The unusual trio perform five adventurous group improvisations that are surprisingly concise and largely self-sufficient despite the lack of any rhythm instruments. Still, this is not a release for the beginner and it is most highly recommended to collectors already quite familiar with Anthony Braxton's explorative musics".

Track listing
All compositions by Anthony Braxton, Evan Parker and Paul Rutherford.
 "The Honker" – 18:04
 "Arkanther" – 10:37
 "Axtarkrut" – 8:23
 "Vanuthrax" – 9:49
 "The Breaker" – 6:38

Personnel 
Anthony Braxton – alto saxophone, sopranino saxophone
Evan Parker – tenor saxophone, soprano saxophone
 Paul Rutherford – trombone

References

Leo Records live albums
Anthony Braxton live albums
Paul Rutherford (trombonist) live albums
Evan Parker live albums
1994 live albums